Scotland Halfmoon is a populated settlement located in the nation of Belize. It is a mainland village that is located in Belize District, between Burrell Boom and Bermudian Landing.

References 

Populated places in Belize District
Belize Rural North